The 2018–19 season will see Glasgow Warriors compete in the competitions: the Guinness Pro14 and the European Champions Cup.

Season overview

New co-captaincy

The Warriors went back to a co-captaincy role - previously done by the club in season 2016-17.

This season Callum Gibbins joined Ryan Wilson as the Warriors' co-captains for the season ahead.

Team

Coaches
Head Coach:  Dave Rennie 
Assistant Coach:   Kenny Murray
Assistant Coach:   Jonathan Humphreys
Assistant Coach:   Jason O'Halloran
Assistant Coach:   Mike Blair
 Forwards Coach:  John Dalziel (from May 2019)
 Head Strength and Conditioning Coach:  Phil Healey (to October 2018)
 Asst. Strength and Conditioning Coach:  Francisco Tavares (to February 2019)
 Asst. Strength and Conditioning Coach:  George Petrakos (now Head S & C)
 Asst. Strength and Conditioning Coach:  Liam Walshe (from December 2018)
 Asst. Strength and Conditioning Coach:  Brad Mayo 
 Lead Performance Analyst: Toby West
 Asst. Performance Analyst: Greg Woolard (now Lead PA)
 Asst. Performance Analyst: Graham O'Riordan (from March 2019)

Staff

 Managing Director: Nathan Bombrys
 Chairman: Charles Shaw
 Advisory Group: Walter Malcolm, Douglas McCrea, Alan Lees, Jim Preston, Paul Taylor
 Rugby Operations Manager: John Manson
 Kit Manager & Masseur: Dougie Mills
 Clinical Manager and Team Physiotherapist: Nicola McGuire
 Rehabilitation Physiotherapist: Gabrielle McCullough
 Team Doctor: Dr. David Pugh
 Team Doctor: Dr. Jonathan Hanson
 Commercial Operations Manager: Alastair Kellock
 Communications Manager: Jeremy Bone
 Communications Asst: Jack Reid
 Content Producer: Graeme Thomson
 Marketing Insight Executive: Claire Scott
 Operations Manager: James Acheson
 Marketing and Partnerships Manager: Darroch Ramsay
 Partnership Sales Manager: Ross Curle
 Partnership Account Manager: Oliver Norman
 Partnership Account Manager: Jim Taylor
 Community Manager: Lindsey Smith
 Community Rugby Coach: Stuart Lewis

Squad

Scottish Rugby Academy Stage 3 players

These players are given a professional contract by the Scottish Rugby Academy. Although given placements they are not contracted by Glasgow Warriors. Players graduate from the Academy when a professional club contract is offered.

These players are assigned to Glasgow Warriors for the season 2018–19. A further intake will be announced later in August 2018.

Academy players promoted in the course of the season are listed with the main squad.

  Robbie Smith - Hooker
  Euan McLaren - Prop
  Murphy Walker - Prop
  Cameron Henderson - Lock
  Marshall Sykes - Lock

  Kaleem Barreto - Scrum half
  Ross Thompson - Fly-half 
  Ollie Smith - Centre
  Logan Trotter - Wing

Back up players

Other players used by Glasgow Warriors over the course of the season.

  Joe Reynolds (Currie) - Fly-half
  Kyle Steyn (Scotland 7s) - Centre

Player statistics

During the 2018–19 season, Glasgow have used 50 different players in competitive games. The table below shows the number of appearances and points scored by each player.

Staff movements

Coaches

Staff promotions

  George Petrakos to Head Strength and Conditioning Coach (from December 2018)
  Greg Woolard to Lead Performance Analyst

Personnel in

  Liam Walshe from  Worcester Warriors Asst. Strength and Conditiioning (from December 2018) Coach
  Brad Mayo from  Bay of Plenty Asst. Strength and Conditiioning Coach
  Graham O'Riordan from  Dragons Asst. Performance Analyst (from March 2019)
  John Dalziel from  Scotland 7s Forwards Coach (from May 2019)

Personnel out

  Phil Healey to  Blues
  Francisco Tavares to  Sporting Lisbon

Medical

Personnel in

 Dr. Jonathan Hanson (Team doctor) (since December 2017)

Personnel out

 Dr. David Pugh

Player movements

Academy promotions
  Bruce Flockhart from Scottish Rugby Academy
  Robbie Nairn from Scottish Rugby Academy
  Adam Nicol from Scottish Rugby Academy
  Stafford McDowall from Scottish Rugby Academy
  Grant Stewart from Scottish Rugby Academy

Player transfers

In
 David Tameilau from  RC Narbonne
  Bruce Flockhart from  Stade Niçois (loan ends)
  Josh Henderson from  Stade Niçois (loan ends)
  Nick Frisby from  Bordeaux Bègles
  Kevin Bryce from  Edinburgh
  Thomas Gordon from  Edinburgh

Out
  Finn Russell to  Racing 92
  Pat MacArthur to  Ayr
  Ryan Grant retired
  Richie Vernon to  London Scottish
  Samuela Vunisa to  Calvisano
  Leonardo Sarto to  Bristol Bears
  Lewis Wynne to  London Scottish (loan)
  Henry Pyrgos to  Edinburgh
  Sam Yawayawa to  Cambridge
  George Stokes to  Darlington Mowden Park
  Josh Henderson to  Scotland 7s
  James Malcolm to  Doncaster Knights (loan)
  Brian Alainu'uese to  Toulon
 
  Robert Beattie to  London Scottish
  Greg Peterson to  Bordeaux Bègles

Competitions

Pre-season and friendlies

The pre-season matches were a mixed bag for the Warriors. Dave Rennie was happy with the Harlequins match at Perth; noting that the Glasgow side were missing 20 internationals.

In contrast, the Northampton Saints match was a bit of a wake-up call. Rennie stated that 'We got beaten up a bit tonight' and blamed a lack of communication, the quality of tackle technique and a lack of patience. On a more positive note he continued 'They’re all things we can tidy up.'

Match 1

Glasgow Warriors: Oli Kebble, James Malcolm, Darcy Rae, Scott Cummings, Johnny Gray, Bruce Flockhart, Chris Fusaro, Matt Smith, Nick Frisby, Brandon Thomson, Lelia Masaga, Paddy Kelly, Sam Johnson, Robbie Nairn, Rory Hughes
Replacements (all used): Kevin Bryce, Grant Stewart, Alex Allan, Adam Nicol, Greg Peterson, Rob Harley, Thomas Gordon, Kaleem Barreto, Adam Hastings, Ratu Tagive, Stafford McDowell, Alex Dunbar, Niko Matawalu, Joe Reynolds, Ruaridh Jackson, Adam Ashe

Harlequins: 15. James Lang, 14. Nathan Earle, 13. Joe Marchant, 12. Ben Tapuai, 11. Gabriel Ibitoye, 10. Marcus Smith, 9. Danny Care,1. Nick Auterac, 2. Dave Ward, 3. Phil Swainston, 4. Stan South, 5. Matt Symons, 6. Dino Lamb, 7. Luke Wallace, 8. Renaldo Bothma
Replacements: Elia Elia, Max Crumpton, Mark Lambert, Will Collier, Hugh Tizard, Ben Glynn, Archie White, Dave Lewis, Charlie Mulchrone,Tim Visser, Henry Cheeseman, Charlie Walker, Ross Chisholm

Match 2

Northampton Saints: Tuala (Mallinder 55); Pisi (Tuitavake 28), Hutchinson (Burrell 5 (Pisi 40 (Collins 75)), Francis (Burrell 55), Collins (Sleightholme 40); Biggar (Grayson 2), Reinach (Mitchell 55); Waller (c) (Davis 40 (van Wyk 60)), Fish (Haywood 40 (Hartley 60)), Franks (Ford-Robinson 40 (Painter 60)); Ribbans (Ratuniyarawa 40), Lawes (Moon 60); Haskell (Gibson 40), Brüssow (Ludlam 40), Harrison (Eadie 40).

Glasgow Warriors: Ruaridh Jackson; Tommy Seymour, Alex Dunbar, Sam Johnson, Niko Matawalu; Adam Hastings, George Horne; Jamie Bhatti, George Turner, Darcy Rae; Scott Cummings, Greg Peterson; Rob Harley, Callum Gibbins(c), Ryan Wilson (c).
Replacements: (all used) Kevin Bryce, Grant Stewart, Alex Allan, Oli Kebble, Adam Nicol, Andrew Davidson, Matt Smith, Adam Ashe, Nick Frisby, Brandon Thomson, Patrick Kelly, Nick Grigg, D. T. H. van der Merwe, Rory Hughes.

Pro14

League table

Results

Round 1

Round 2

Round 3

Round 4

Round 5

Round 6

Round 7

Round 8

Round 9

Round 10

Round 11 - 1872 Cup 1st Leg

Round 12 - 1872 Cup 2nd Leg

Round 13

Round 14

Round 15

Round 16

Round 17

Round 18

Round 19

Round 20

Round 21 - 1872 Cup 3rd Leg

Edinburgh won the 1872 Cup with a series score of 2 - 1.

Play-offs

Semi-finals

Final

Europe

Pool

Results

Round 1

Round 2

Round 3

Round 4

Round 5

Round 6

Quarter-finals

Warrior of the month awards

End of Season awards

Competitive debuts this season

A player's nationality shown is taken from the nationality at the highest honour for the national side obtained; or if never capped internationally their place of birth. Senior caps take precedence over junior caps or place of birth; junior caps take precedence over place of birth. A player's nationality at debut may be different from the nationality shown. Combination sides like the British and Irish Lions or Pacific Islanders are not national sides, or nationalities.

Players in BOLD font have been capped by their senior international XV side as nationality shown.

Players in Italic font have capped either by their international 7s side; or by the international XV 'A' side as nationality shown.

Players in normal font have not been capped at senior level.

A position in parentheses indicates that the player debuted as a substitute. A player may have made a prior debut for Glasgow Warriors in a non-competitive match, 'A' match or 7s match; these matches are not listed.

Tournaments where competitive debut made:

Crosshatching indicates a jointly hosted match.

Sponsorship
 SP Energy Networks - Title Sponsor and Community Sponsor
 Scottish Power - Official Kit

Official Kit Supplier

 Macron

Official kit sponsors
 Malcolm Group
 McCrea Financial Services
 Denholm Oilfield
 Ross Hall Hospital
 Story Contracting
 Leidos

Official sponsors
 The Famous Grouse
 Clyde Travel Management
 Harper Macleod
 Caledonia Best
 Eden Mill Brewery and Distillery
 David Lloyd Leisure
 Crabbie's
 CALA Homes
 Capital Solutions
 Martha's Restaurant
 Sterling Furniture

Official partners
 A.G. Barr
 Benchmarx
 Black & Lizars
 Cameron House
 Glasgow Airport
 Healthspan Elite
 KubeNet
 Mentholatum
 MSC Nutrition
 Smile Plus
 Lenco Utilities
 Scot JCB News Scotland
 HF Group
 Primestaff
 Village Hotel Club
 The Crafty Pig
 Kooltech
 Savills
 iPro Sports
 RHA

References

2018-19
2018–19 in Scottish rugby union
2018–19 Pro14 by team
2018–19 European Rugby Champions Cup by team